Murat Cem Akpınar (born 24 January 1999) is a professional footballer who plays as a midfielder for Turkish club Giresunspor on loan from Trabzonspor. Born in Turkey, he has represented Azerbaijan at youth level.

Professional career
Akpınar made his professional debut for Trabzonspor in a 3–1 Süper Lig win over Göztepe S.K. on 22 February 2019.

International career
Born in Turkey, Akpınar is of Azerbaijani and Turkish descent. He represented the Azerbaijan U17s in 2015.

Honours
Trabzonspor
 Süper Lig: 2021–22

References

External links
 
 
 
 Trabzonspor Profile

1999 births
Turkish people of Azerbaijani descent
Sportspeople of Azerbaijani descent
Citizens of Azerbaijan through descent
Azerbaijani people of Turkish descent
People from Düzköy
Living people
Azerbaijani footballers
Turkish footballers
Association football midfielders
Azerbaijan youth international footballers
Trabzonspor footballers
1461 Trabzon footballers
Kocaelispor footballers
Giresunspor footballers
Süper Lig players
TFF Second League players
TFF Third League players